The QQ Music Awards is a music awards show founded by Chinese music streaming service QQ Music in 2014.

Ceremonies

Awards 
2016 QQ Music Awards

Best Male Singer (Mainland China)
Best Female Singer (Mainland China)
Best Male Singer (Hong Kong/Taiwan)
Best Female Singer (Hong Kong/Taiwan)
Best Group
Most Popular Male Singer (Mainland China)
Most Popular Female Singer (Mainland China)
Most Popular Male Singer (Hong Kong/Taiwan)
Most Popular Female Singer (Hong Kong/Taiwan)
Most Popular Western Singer
Most Popular Mandarin Group
Most Popular Overseas Group
Most Influential Male Singer
Most Influential Female Singer
Best New Singer
Best New Group
Most Breakthrough Artist
Best Crossover Artist
QQ Music Chart Most Searched Singer
QQ Music Chart Most Shared Award
QQ Music Live Best Stage Performance
Best Stage Performance
Best Television Music Show
Best Classical Album
Best Concert Album
Best Creative Album
Best Live Album
Best Singing-Songwriting Album
Best Mandarin Album (Mainland China)
Best Mandarin Album (Hong Kong/Taiwan)
Best Music Video
Best Producer
Best All-Round Artist
Most Influential Concert
Outstanding Contribution Singer
QQ Music Favorite Singer
International Most Influential Chinese Artist
Best Selling Digital Album (Mainland China)
Best Selling Digital Album (Hong Kong/Taiwan)
Best Selling Digital Album (Overseas)
Best Film/Television Songs of the Year
Top 10 Songs of the Year
Media Recommend Album
Best International Single
QQ Music Fans Award

References

Tencent
Tencent Music
Chinese music awards
Annual events in China
Culture in Shenzhen
2014 establishments in China
Recurring events established in 2014
Events in Shenzhen